Fothergill is a surname, thought to have come from the meaning 'Further river' and may refer to the following:

 Alastair Fothergill, English TV producer
 Allodin Fothergill (born 1987), Jamaican athlete
 Andrew Fothergill, English cricketer
 Anthony Fothergill (physician) (1732–1813), English physician
 Anthony Fothergill (theologian) (1686–1761), English theological writer
 Arnold Fothergill (1854–1932), English cricketer
 Bob Fothergill (1897–1938), American baseball player
 Charles Fothergill (1782–1840), Canadian journalist and politician
 Des Fothergill, Australian rules footballer
 George Algernon Fothergill (1868-1945), Scottish illustrator and painter
 Jessie Fothergill (1851–1891), English novelist
 John Fothergill (engineer) (born 1953), Pro-Vice-Chancellor of City University London
 John Fothergill (innkeeper) (1876–1957), English innkeeper and entrepreneur
 John Fothergill (merchant) (1730–1782), merchant from Birmingham, England
 John Fothergill (physician) FRS (1712–1780), English physician, plant collector, philanthropist and Quaker
 John Fothergill (priest) (1808–1851), the inaugural Archdeacon of Berbice
 John Milner Fothergill, M.D. (1841–1888), British physician and medical writer
 Marmaduke Fothergill (1652–1731), scholar and collector
 Miles Fothergill, British actor
 Pat Fothergill, Scottish roboticist
 Philip Fothergill, English businessman and politician
 Philip G. Fothergill FRSE FIAL (1908–1967), British biologist and historian of science
 Richard Fothergill (ironmaster) (1758–1821), ironmaster in South Wales
 Richard Fothergill (politician) (1822-1903), British politician and businessman
 Samuel Fothergill (1715–1772), Quaker minister
 Tessa Fothergill, founder of the British single-parent charity Gingerbread 
 Thomas Fothergill, English academic administrator at the University of Oxford
 Thomas Fothergill (ironmaster) (1791–1858), ironmaster, sheriff of Monmouthshire
 Watson Fothergill, English architect
 William Edward Fothergill (born 1865), professor of clinical obstetrics and gynaecology at the University of Manchester

See also
 Fothergill (disambiguation)
 Fothergilla
 Henry Fothergill Chorley (1808–1872), English music critic
 William Fothergill Cooke (1806–1879), English inventor
 John Fothergill Crosfield (1915–2012), inventor and entrepreneur
 Abraham Cecil Francis Fothergill Rowlands (1856–1914) aka Cecil Raleigh, English actor and playwright
 Mr Fothergill's, a British seed merchant based in Kentford in Suffolk, England

English-language surnames